Daniel Sosah (born 21 September 1998) is a Nigerien professional footballer who plays for Kryvbas Kryvyi Rih. Born in Ghana, he represents the Niger national team.

International career
Sosah was born in Ghana to a Beninois father and Ghanaian mother, and began his career in Niger where he was naturalized. He debuted for the Niger national team in a 6–1 2022 FIFA World Cup qualification loss to Algeria on 8 October 2021, where he scored his side's only goal.

International goals
Scores and results list Niger's goal tally first.

References

External links 
 
 
 

1998 births
Living people
Footballers from Accra
Nigerien footballers
Niger international footballers
Ghanaian footballers
Nigerien people of Ghanaian descent
Nigerien people of Beninese descent
Ghanaian people of Beninese descent
Ghanaian emigrants to Niger
Association football forwards
Nigerien expatriate footballers
Ghanaian expatriate footballers
Expatriate footballers in Israel
Expatriate footballers in Guinea
Expatriate footballers in Niger
Expatriate footballers in Belarus
Expatriate footballers in Ukraine
Nigerien expatriate sportspeople in Ukraine
AS FAN players
CI Kamsar players
FC Isloch Minsk Raion players
FC Kryvbas Kryvyi Rih players